A. Radhika Suresh is a table tennis player from Kerala, India. She is an Olympian and former national champion.

Family
She belongs to a family of table tennis players. Her father K.R. Pillai was a former Tamil Nadu and Kerala state champion and her elder brother, R. Rajesh too is a former state champion.

Achievements
Following are her achievements.

State
 At the age of 10 she won the Kerala State sub-junior title.

National
 Won national sub-junior title at Muzaffarpur in 1986
 Won national junior's title at Indore in 1989
 Won national women's title at Pondicherry in 1995
 Women's singles titles in the 22nd National veterans table tennis championship at the Rajiv Gandhi indoor stadium at Kochi in 2015

International
 World championships in 1991, 1993 and 1995
 Commonwealth championships in 1991, 1993 and 1995
 Asian Table Tennis Championships in 1990, 1992 and 1994
 1996 Atlanta Olympics table tennis event 
 was part of the silver medal-winning Indian squad in the team event at the 1991 Nairobi Commonwealth Table Tennis Championships, .
 won all three gold medals, winning the singles, doubles and team events, at the 1991 Colombo and the 1993 Dhaka South Asian Federation Games.

Personal life
She is employed at Indian Oil Corporation as Customer Services Executive. She also runs an academy at the Kadavanthra YMCA.

References

Indian female table tennis players
Living people
Olympic table tennis players of India
Table tennis players at the 1996 Summer Olympics
Year of birth missing (living people)
South Asian Games gold medalists for India
South Asian Games medalists in table tennis